St. Johns Township is an inactive township in Franklin County, in the U.S. state of Missouri.

St. Johns Township takes its name from Saint Johns Creek.

References

Townships in Missouri
Townships in Franklin County, Missouri